William Hooker (1779–1832) was a British illustrator of natural history. He studied under Franz Bauer (1758–1840), becoming the official artist of the Royal Horticultural Society from 1812 until retirement in 1820, whose publications he illustrated. His paintings of fruit were particularly appreciated.

Hooker also worked on the "Oriental Memoirs" of James Forbes and The Paradisus Londinensis with descriptions by Richard Anthony Salisbury (1761–1829). He contributed illustrations for "Hooker's Finest Fruits" until his death in 1832.

See also 
 Hooker's green, a green pigment, useful for representing leaves.

References 

British botanists
1779 births
1832 deaths
Botanical illustrators